Luc Kassi (born 20 August 1994) is an Ivorian footballer who last played for Eliteserien side Stabæk.

He played for a football academy in Ivory Coast, and was scouted by Stabæk along with Franck Boli and Sayouba Mandé. After training with Stabæk over a longer period, he signed a professional contract with the club on his eighteenth birthday. He made his league debut for Stabæk as a substitute in the victory against Odd Grenland on 16 September 2012.

Career statistics

Club

References

1994 births
Living people
Ivorian footballers
Stabæk Fotball players
Eliteserien players
Norwegian First Division players
Ivorian expatriate footballers
Expatriate footballers in Norway
Ivorian expatriate sportspeople in Norway
Footballers from Abidjan
Association football midfielders